Nadja (1928), the second book published by André Breton, is one of the iconic works of the French surrealist movement. It begins with the question "Who am I?"

It is based on Breton's actual interactions with a young woman, Nadja (actually Léona Camille Ghislaine Delacourt 1902–1941), over the course of ten days, and is presumed to be a semi-autobiographical description of his relationship with a patient of Pierre Janet.  The book's non-linear structure is grounded in reality by references to other Paris surrealists such as Louis Aragon and 44 photographs.

The last sentence of the book ("Beauty will be CONVULSIVE or will not be at all") provided the title for Pierre Boulez's flute concerto ...explosante-fixe....

Dating from 1960, the widely available English translation by Richard Howard is a translation of the first edition of Breton's novel, dating from 1928. Breton published a second, revised edition in 1963. No English translation of this second edition is currently available.

Summary
The narrator, named André, ruminates on a number of Surrealist principles, before ultimately commencing (around a third of the way through the novel) on a narrative account, generally linear, of his brief ten-day affair with the titular character Nadja. She is so named “because in Russian it's the beginning of the word hope, and because it's only the beginning,” but her name might also evoke the Spanish "Nadie," which means "No one."  The narrator becomes obsessed with this woman with whom he, upon a chance encounter while walking through the street, strikes up conversation immediately.  He becomes reliant on daily rendezvous, occasionally culminating in romance (a kiss here and there).  His true fascination with Nadja, however, is her vision of the world, which is often provoked through a discussion of the work of a number of Surrealist artists, including himself.  While her understanding of existence subverts the rigidly authoritarian quotidian, it is later discovered that she is mad and belongs in a sanitarium.  After Nadja reveals too many details of her past life, she in a sense becomes demystified, and the narrator realizes that he cannot continue their relationship.

In the remaining quarter of the text, André distances himself from her corporeal form and descends into a meandering rumination on her absence, so much so that one wonders if her absence offers him greater inspiration than does her presence.  It is, after all, the reification and materialization of Nadja as an ordinary person that André ultimately despises and cannot tolerate to the point of inducing tears.  There is something about the closeness once felt between the narrator and Nadja that indicated a depth beyond the limits of conscious rationality, waking logic, and sane operations of the everyday. There is something essentially “mysterious, improbable, unique, bewildering” about her; this reinforces the notion that their propinquity serves only to remind André of Nadja's impenetrability. Her eventual recession into absence is the fundamental concern of this text, an absence that permits Nadja to live freely in André's conscious and unconscious, seemingly unbridled, maintaining her paradoxical role as both present and absent.  With Nadja's past fixed within his own memory and consciousness, the narrator is awakened to the impenetrability of reality and perceives a particularly ghostly residue peeking from under its thin veil.  Thus, he might better put into practice his theory of Surrealism, predicated on the dreaminess of the experience of reality within reality itself.

Quotations
 "Don't I love her? When I am near her I am nearer things which are near her."
 "Beauty will be convulsive or will not be at all."
 "He cannot enter, he does not enter."
 "I am obliged to reply that I know nothing about it, that in such matters the right to bear witness seems to me to be all that is granted."
 "You could never see this star as I do.  You don't understand: It's like the heart of a heartless flower."

See also 
Le Monde 100 Books of the Century

References 

1928 French novels
French autobiographical novels
Works by André Breton
Surrealist novels
Nonlinear narrative novels